{{DISPLAYTITLE:C25H34O6}}
The molecular formula C25H34O6 (molar mass: 430.53 g/mol, exact mass: 430.2355 u) may refer to:

 Budesonide (BUD)
 Dexbudesonide
 Ingenol mebutate
 YK-11

Molecular formulas